Pseudoclanis aequabilis is a moth of the  family Sphingidae. It is known from Tanzania.

The length of the forewings is 56–73 mm (dry season form) and 73–80 mm (wet season form) for males and 76 mm (dry season form) and 96 mm (wet season form) for females. The general colour of the upperside of the body and forewings is a very uniform pale grey-yellow. The thorax has a fine but well marked median black line. The underside of the wings is a very pale grey-yellow, sometimes almost white on the hindwings, with the grey margin of the outer edge less marked and sometimes with vestiges of grey transverse lines. There is no basal spot on the two wings in the dry season form. The upperside of the body and wings of the wet season form are virtually identical to those of the dry season form in their uniformity, but darker. The undersides of the wings in the wet season form are practically identical to those of the dry season form. The forewing upperside has a weak, dark grey, elongate spot on the costa. The forewing upperside is greenish grey for the wet season form.

References

Pseudoclanis
Moths described in 2005